Sebi (also Romanized as Şebī; also known as Qal‘eh Bālā Şebī) is a village in Zaveh Rural District in the Central District of Zaveh County, Razavi Khorasan Province, Iran. At the 2006 census, its population was 203, with 58 families.

References 

Populated places in Zaveh County